Ambergate railway station is a railway station owned by Network Rail and managed by East Midlands Railway. It serves the village of Ambergate in Derbyshire, England. The station is located on the Derwent Valley Line from Derby to Matlock, which diverges from the Midland Main Line just south of the station at Ambergate Junction.

History
It has a complicated history. The original station was built for the North Midland Railway in 1840, between Derby and Leeds. It was an ornate building, by Francis Thompson, which would have graced a Lord of the Manor.

From Belper the line ran along the Derwent Valley, along a stretch called Broadholme, with four bridges across the river, through Longlands Tunnel, across the River Derwent and Derby road with a magnificent five-arch viaduct. It then entered Hag Wood Tunnel as turned towards the Amber Valley.

The station building was just north of this tunnel. Shortly afterwards a proposal was made for an Ambergate, Nottingham, Boston and Eastern Junction Railway which however never materialised, apart from a stretch between Colwick and Grantham.

From Ambergate, towards Chesterfield, the next difficulty for the North Midland Railway was the intersection with the Cromford Canal, where the line intersected with the Bullbridge Aqueduct, before it carried on through a station at Wingfield to Stretton.

However, in 1849, the branch from Ambergate to Rowsley was built by the proposed Manchester, Buxton, Matlock and Midlands Junction Railway, with a west to north connection between the lines at the original Ambergate Junction. When a south to west connection was made, for trains from Derby to Rowsley, in 1863 the station building was rebuilt adjacent to the new Ambergate South junction. The original bridge was also widened at its northern end to accommodate the new junction.

In 1867 the Rowsley line had reached New Mills, which meant that the Midland Railway could operate from London to Manchester and Liverpool.

In 1875 Ambergate to Pye Bridge Line was opened from Crich Junction near Bullbridge which ran through Butterley to Pye Bridge, near Ironville on the Erewash Valley Line. Much of its business was coal traffic from Nottinghamshire to Manchester and Liverpool, avoiding Derby.

The triangular station
In 1876 a loop was built passing the west side of Hag Wood Tunnel, as a diversion from the original line to a third platform, which allowed for Derby to Sheffield stopping trains. The station was completely rebuilt, with the old building remaining in use a plans store. This third and final station was the famous triangular one, reputed to be one of only three in the country.

On Monday 20 March 1899 a fire broke out on the down platform for the North which destroyed 30 yards of platform, together with the booking hall, stationmaster’s office and waiting rooms. The fire brigade from Belper were summoned as well as the Midland Railway company brigade from Derby. 

Throughout the late 19th and early 20th centuries, Ambergate was an important railway interchange with 28,207 tickets sold in 1872 rising to 90,157 by 1922.

In 1931 the line across Broadholme approaching from the south was upgraded to four tracks. Longlands Tunnel was opened up to form a wide cutting and the junction with the Manchester line was moved south of the river. A new modern steel bridge for the Manchester line was built alongside the original viaduct over the River Derwent and the A6 main road.

The line through Matlock, then the 'main line', carried London to Manchester expresses such as the Palatine and the Peaks. It also carried coal trains from Nottinghamshire, for a while with Garratt locomotives, which would be split at Rowsley for the long climb to Peak Forest.

Grouping and Nationalisation
Having gathered in the Midland Railway, the lines through the station became part of the London, Midland and Scottish Railway during the Grouping of 1923. The station then passed on to the London Midland Region of British Railways on nationalisation in 1948.

On 5 April 1950 there was another fire at the station which destroyed a waiting room on platform 1 which carried the up line to Manchester. Two painters were working on the waiting room at the time. 

When Sectorisation was introduced in the 1980s, the station was served by Regional Railways until the Privatisation of British Railways.

Decline
The stopping service on the former North Midland route to Chesterfield & Sheffield (using the eastern platforms on the slow lines) was withdrawn in January 1967, when the other local stations on this section were closed.  Most of the trackwork on the Derwent Valley line was lifted in 1968, soon after the closure of line from Rowsley to Buxton & Manchester  whilst the line eastwards from Crich Junction to  & Pye Bridge closed completely in December that year. The station buildings were removed in 1970. Although the triangular station site remained for a number of years, the eastern road bridge over the A610 was finally removed in the late 1980s. All that is left now is one platform on the surviving single track to Matlock, and the original main Derby to Sheffield line passing to the east through Hag Wood (Toadmoor) Tunnel and onwards to Clay Cross and Chesterfield. The original listing of Ambergate station for closure under the Beeching Axe led to its mention in the song "Slow Train" by Flanders and Swann.

Stationmasters

Thomas Whitmore ca. 1853 ca. 1857
Charles Grundy ca. 1860 - 1898
Robert Manners 1898 - 1925 (formerly station master at Chinley)
Albert Ernest Weatherly 1925 - 1928 (formerly station master at Runcorn)
H.J. Bates 1928 - 1932 (formerly station master at Daventry)
W. Turner 1933 - 1952 (formerly station master at Goostrey)
Bernard Gower ca. 1955

Facilities
The station is unstaffed although there is a self-service ticket machine for ticket purchases and a shelter and help point on the platform.

There is a car park at the entrance to the station as well as a small bicycle storage facility. Step-free access is available to the platform at Ambergate.

Services
All services at Ambergate are operated by East Midlands Railway.

Saturdays also have an hourly service but all the trains originate or end in Derby.

On Sundays, there is a two-hourly service between Matlock and Nottingham in the morning, with services increasing to hourly from mid-afternoon onwards.

References
References

Sources
 Pixton, B., (2000) North Midland: Portrait of a Famous Route, Chelteham: Runpast Publishing
 
 
 Station on navigable O.S. map

External links

 "Picture the Past" Original station  building at Ambergate
 "Picture the Past" Triangular Station circa 1910
 "Picture the Past" View of the station

History of Derbyshire
Railway stations in Derbyshire
DfT Category F2 stations
Former Midland Railway stations
Railway stations in Great Britain opened in 1840
Railway stations in Great Britain closed in 1863
Railway stations in Great Britain opened in 1863
Railway stations in Great Britain closed in 1876
Railway stations in Great Britain opened in 1876
Railway stations served by East Midlands Railway
Francis Thompson railway stations